Cooks is an unincorporated community in Schoolcraft County, Michigan, United States. Cooks has a post office with ZIP code 49817.

History 
Cooks was founded in 1883 when John C. Cook built a sawmill at the community. The community was originally named Cook's Mills before being shortened to Cooks. A post office opened in the community on June 28, 1888; Norman McDonald was the first postmaster. The community had a station on the Minneapolis, St. Paul and Sault Ste. Marie Railroad under the name Cooks Mill.

References

Unincorporated communities in Schoolcraft County, Michigan
Populated places established in 1883
Unincorporated communities in Michigan